List of power stations in Georgia may refer to:

List of power stations in Georgia (country)
List of power stations in Georgia (U.S. state)